Ross Edgley (born 13 October 1985) is an extreme adventurer, ultra-marathon sea swimmer and author. He holds multiple world records, but is best known for completing the World's Longest Staged Sea Swim in 2018, when he became the first person in history to swim  all the way around Great Britain in 157 days. 

Voted Performance of the Year by the World Open Water Swimming Association, he documented his training, nutrition, theories and strategies and published them in his books titled The World's Fittest Book (2018), The Art of Resilience (2020), and Blueprint: Build a Bulletproof Body for Extreme Adventure in 365 Days (2021), all of which became No.1 Sunday Times Bestsellers and have been translated into several other languages.

Background
Edgley was born into a sporting family in Grantham, Lincolnshire. His father was a tennis coach, his mother was a sprinter and his grandparents were marathon runners and in the military. Although playing many sports as a child (football, rugby, trail running and tennis), he specialised in swimming and water polo and represented his country internationally at junior level whilst studying at King's Grammar School in Grantham, England (a school famously attended by Sir Isaac Newton between 1655 and 1660). 

He later gained a sports scholarship to study at Loughborough University's School of Sport and Exercise Science, where he continued to train at the British Swimming National Centre. A year into his scholarship, Edgley then retired from international competition and decided to transition into ultra-distance sea swimming instead, which the university supported through the National Centre for Sport and Exercise Medicine (an Olympic legacy project delivering education, research and clinical services in sport, exercise and physical activity). 

In 2019, he received an honorary doctorate from Bishop Grosseteste University (BGU) in Lincoln, for his research into mental and physical resilience and continues to coach and lecture around the world as a leading expert in the science and psychology of adventure.

Swimming records

The Great British Swim (2018)

Between June and November 2018, Edgley completed a 157-day  swim around Britain. Aided by a team of experts which monitored the tides and his health in his  support boat Hecate, he typically swam for six hours, rested for six hours, and then swam for another six hours on repeat. He typically consumed around 15,000 calories a day. 

The gruelling swim took its toll on his body, disintegrating his tongue through the eroding effect of the salt, giving him "Rhino Neck" from the effect of the wetsuit rubbing, and his feet entirely losing their arches and turning a deep purple and yellow. The team treated him with Sudocrem, Vaseline, plasters, bin bags and duct tape. Edgley's journey was documented as a weekly internet series, "Ross Edgley's Great British Swim", produced by Red Bull TV. 

After completing the swim in Margate on 4 November 2018, the World Open Water Swimming Association announced it as the World Swim of the Year 2018 and it became officially recognised as "The World's Longest Staged Sea Swim." Talking about his historic swim Edgley said, "It's my hope that people remember the Great British Swim as an example or experiment in both mental and physical fortitude."

Length of the English Channel (2018) 
During his circumnavigation swim of Great Britain, Edgley also broke several other records. Notably this involved becoming the first person to swim the length of the English Channel from Dover to Land's End, over 350 miles (563 km) in 30 days. 
Edgley never celebrated the achievement, however, and instead joked it was only a "warm up" because he still had 1,442 miles to swim (and 127 days at sea) before he completed his much larger mission and arrived back in Margate, Kent.

Land's End to John o' Groats (2018) 
More than halving the time of the previous record (from Sean Conway of 135 days), Edgley and his crew said they did not realise they had broken another record and were just trying to swim fast enough to avoid an Arctic storm approaching from Iceland. He then became the first person to swim the length of the Moray Firth, before heading to the English border at Berwick-upon-Tweed where he joked, "It was all downhill from here".

Loch Ness swim (2022) 
On 23 September 2022, Edgley attempted a charity swim in Loch Ness. In preparation for the extreme endurance event and to counteract the cold effect of continual immersion in water, he gained 10 kilos of weight by consuming 10,000 calories a day.

After 52 hours and 39 minutes he was forced to end his swim early due to the onset of cellulitis and hypothermia and was taken to hospital where he messaged: "As you can probably tell the swim didn’t entirely go to plan, but the awareness raised for the charity was immense which makes the cellulitis and lost skin worth it." The swim was done in support of Parley for the Oceans (a nonprofit environmental organisation that focuses on protection of the ocean) and the preservation of Scottish sea kelp forests, so was not governed by any swimming authority. The route and precise distance are unknown due to medical intervention.

Other athletic achievements 
On 22 January 2016, Edgley began a marathon around the Silverstone circuit in Northamptonshire, pulling a  car. The event was dubbed "The World's Strongest Marathon". As part of his training for the event, he went on a special 6,000 calorie plus daily diet and had already done a  pull with the Mini during training. He completed the marathon endeavor to raise money for the Teenage Cancer Trust, Children With Cancer, Sports Aid and United Through Sport. 

The money raised went to the Teenage Cancer Trust. 

Other work
In 2009, Edgley took part in a BBC reality television series called Tough Guy or Chicken?, taking on challenges with deadly animals and in hostile locations around the world.

In 2019, he coached several non-swimmers to swim the English Channel in Sink or Swim.

The World's Fittest Book (2018)
In May 2018, Edgley published The World's Fittest Book, which combines the teachings, tips and tricks of Olympic champions, world record holders and celebrated military personnel and knowledge he had acquired from extensive travelling around the world. It took over 10 years to research and write, with Edgley visiting over 100 countries and documenting a wide range of phenomenon from ice-cold waterfall meditation by the Yamabushi monks in Japan to ultra-marathon running in the Namibian wilderness. The book became a Sunday Times Bestseller and has been praised for comprehensively covering the topics of food, fat loss, strength, speed and stamina.

The Art of Resilience (2020)
In May 2020, Edgley published his second book titled The Art of Resilience which also became a Sunday Times No.1 Bestseller. It focuses on mental strength, stoicism and the physical training needed to create an unbreakable body as he details how he completed the World's Longest Sea Swim (157 days, 1,792 miles (2,884 km) around Britain). Edgley uses his experience (and other endurance feats) to study the performance of extreme athletes, military and fitness specialists and psychologists to uncover the secrets of mental fortitude and explore the concept of resilience, persistence, valor and a disciplined mindset in overcoming adversity. Edgley wrote the book to create a paradigm shift in what we thought the human body and mind were capable of and hoped it would help people become a tougher, more resilient and ultimately better humans that are better equipped to overcome adversity, no matter the challenge they may face.

References

Publications

External links

 
 

1985 births
Living people
English sportswriters
Alumni of Loughborough University
People from Grantham
World record holders in swimming